Hubbard Landing Seaplane Base  is a privately owned public-use seaplane base in Baldwin County, Alabama, United States. It is located five nautical miles (6 mi, 9 km) southeast of the central business district of Stockton, Alabama.

Facilities 
Hubbard Landing Seaplane Base has one seaplane landing area designated 16W/34W which measures 6,000 by 300 feet (1,829 x 91 m).

References

External links 
 Aerial image as of 16 February 1997 from USGS The National Map

Airports in Baldwin County, Alabama
Seaplane bases in the United States